Michela Monari, Italian female volleyball player
 Pellegrino Monari, Italian painter
 10722 Monari, a minor planet
 Harkaleh-ye Monari, village in Sadat Rural District, in the Central District of Lali County, Khuzestan Province, Iran